Delias nuydaorum  is a species of pierine butterfly  endemic to Mindanao in the Philippines. The type locality is Mount Kitanlad, Mindanao.

The wingspan is 52–57 mm.

Subspecies
Delias nuydaorum nuydaorum (Mt. Kitanlad, central Mindanao)
Delias nuydaorum almae Schroeder & Treadaway, 2005 (southern Mindanao)
Delias nuydaorum tagai Yagishita & Morita, 1996 (Mt. Matutum, southern Mindanao)

References

nuydaorum
Butterflies described in 1975